Padmasana is a term derived from Sanskrit word padma: lotus, and āsana: seat or throne, and may refer to:
 Lotus throne in Hindu–Buddhist art
 Lotus position in yoga
 Padmasana (shrine), a type of Balinese Hindu shrine